is a Japanese football player.

Club statistics
Updated to 23 February 2019.

References

External links

1986 births
Living people
Tokyo University of Agriculture alumni
Association football people from Kanagawa Prefecture
Japanese footballers
J2 League players
J3 League players
Japan Football League players
Tochigi SC players
SC Sagamihara players
Association football defenders